Jetstar Asia's first flight took off on 13 December 2004 to Hong Kong, one of the two initial destinations from Singapore.  Jetstar Asia was established six months after Jetstar Airways first commenced its domestic operation in Australia.

The destinations below are operated by Jetstar Asia Airways, and does not include destinations only served by Jetstar Airways.

Destinations
The list shows airports that have been served by Jetstar Asia Airways as part of its scheduled services from 2004 to present. The list includes the city, country, the codes of the International Air Transport Association (IATA airport code) and the International Civil Aviation Organization (ICAO airport code), and the airport's name, with the airline's hub marked. The list also contains the beginning and if the destination was terminated, the end year of services is marked. Additionally, destinations have been served non-continuously has been marked. (services to those destinations that have been suspended or terminated and subsequently resumed or recommenced).

See also
Jetstar destinations

References

Lists of airline destinations